The Expanding Flower Planet is the first studio album by Deradoorian, a former member of Dirty Projectors. It was released on Anticon on August 21, 2015. Co-produced with Kenny Gilmore, it features contributions from Jeremy Hyman, Michael Lockwood, Niki Randa, and Arlene Deradoorian. The title comes from a Chinese mandala tapestry that hung in Deradoorian's studio.

Critical reception

At Metacritic, which assigns a weighted average score out of 100 to reviews from mainstream critics, The Expanding Flower Planet received an average score of 78, based on 17 reviews, indicating "generally favorable reviews".

Alex McCown of The A.V. Club gave the album a grade of B, saying, "Despite most songs consisting of little more than a simple drum beat, bass, and some synths buffeting Deradoorian's soaring and layered vocal tracks, it wouldn't be accurate to call the arrangements spare." Daniel Sylester of Exclaim! gave the album an 8 out of 10 and said, "On The Expanding Flower Planet, Deradoorian melds atmospheric dance beats with world music melodies, crafting a sound reminiscent of early Sinéad O'Connor."

Daniel Paton of MusicOMH gave the album 4 stars out of 5 and said, "Deradoorian has demonstrated here that she is a confident, mature and distinctive artist." John Paul of PopMatters gave the album 8 stars out of 10 and called it "a confident declaration of independence from a vital artist operating at the top of her creative game."

The Skinny placed it at number 47 on the "50 Best Albums of 2015" list.

Track listing

Personnel
Credits adapted from liner notes.

 Angel Deradoorian – vocals, drums, guitar, bass guitar, banjo, synthesizer, flute, piano, production, recording, mixing, layout, design
 Kenny Gilmore – guitar, synthesizer, production, recording, mixing
 Arlene Deradoorian – vocals
 Niki Randa – vocals
 Jeremy Hyman – drums
 Michael Lockwood – drums
 Sonny Diperri – mixing
 Dave Cooley – mastering
 Daniel Higgs – cover artwork
 Brian DeRan – other artwork
 Bryant Rutledge – layout, design

References

External links
 
 

2015 debut albums
Anticon albums